Nicolas Crosbie (born 2 April 1980 in Niort, Deux-Sèvres) is a French professional road bicycle racer who is currently unattached.

Palmares 

 2007 Giro d'Italia - 88th
 Tour de la Guadeloupe - 1 stage (2004)

References

External links 
Profile at Bouygues Télécom official website

1980 births
Living people
People from Niort
French male cyclists
Tour de Guadeloupe stage winners
Sportspeople from Deux-Sèvres
Cyclists from Nouvelle-Aquitaine